Coelodasys errucata is a species of moth in the family Notodontidae (the prominents). It was first described by Harrison Gray Dyar Jr. in 1906, and is found in North America.

The MONA or Hodges number for Coelodasys errucata is 8008.

This species was formerly a member of the genus Schizura, but was transferred to Coelodasys as a result of research published in 2021.

References

Further reading

 
 
 

Notodontidae
Articles created by Qbugbot
Moths described in 1906